Shlyopali shlyopki is the second studio album by Ukrainian singer Olya Polyakova released 27 January 2017. The album mainly contains songs that have already been released before, but according to Polyakova's idea, the playlist should reflect her real creative path. Polyakova calls her style "vernacular pop".

The album was preceded by the all-Ukrainian tour "Shlyopali shlyopki", which gave the name to the album.

Track listing

References 

Olya Polyakova albums
2017 albums
Russian-language albums